Vahan Hovhannesi Totovents (September 1, 1889 – July 18, 1938) was an Armenian writer, poet and public activist.

Biography

Vahan Totovents was born on July 17, 1893 in the town of Mezre (now Elazığ) in the vilayet of Kharberd. He graduated from the Kharberd National Central School in 1907; among his teachers were the authors Tlgadintsi and Rupen Zartarian. He left for Constantinople in 1908. In 1909 he went to Paris, and then to New York. In 1912 he began his studies at the University of Wisconsin-Madison, where he studied literature, history and philosophy. During World War I, he served as a secretary to Andranik Ozanian and participated in the battles of Erzurum and Van. He then worked with poet Hovhannes Tumanyan to organized humanitarian relief for survivors of the Armenain genocide. In 1917–1918 he edited the Tiflis-based newspaper Hayastan. In 1920 he left Armenia and traveled across Southern Europe.

Totovents welcomed the sovietization of Armenia and repatriated to Soviet Armenia in 1922. He worked for the satirical monthly Shesht in 1923 and for the official state newspaper Sovetakan Hayastan in 1924–26. He also worked at Yerevan State University. Totovents was arrested in 1936 and executed in 1938 during the Great Purge. He was rehabilitated in 1954.

Works
Totovents published his first work in 1907. His notable works include the novels, stories and dramas Doktor Burbonian (1918), Mahvan batalion ("Death Battalion", 1923), New York (1927), Baku (v. 1-3, 1930–34), Hovnatʻan vordi Yeremiayi ("Jonathan, Son of Jeremiah", 1934). His collection of autobiographical short stories Kyankʻě hin Hṛomeakan chanaparhi vra ("Life on the Old Roman Road", which "reflect[s] the society, culture, and mores not only of the Armenians of his childhood but also of their neighbors in the waning days of the Ottoman Empire", was particularly influential on Armenian literature. The Armenian film A Piece of Sky (1980) directed by Henrik Malian is based on Totovents's short story "Light-Blue Flowers".

His works have been translated into Russian, English, French, Bulgarian and Turkish.

Books

In English
Scenes from an Armenian Childhood, 1962, NY: Oxford University Press, 182 p.,
Tell Me, Bella (a Selection of Stories), 1972, 127 p.,
Jonathan, Son of Jeremiah (Mashtots paperbacks), 1985, 68 p.,
Pigeon Fancier, 1994, 66 p., .

In French
Une enfance arménienne, Julliard, 1985, 194 p., .

External links
Vahan Totovents (1893-1938) Présentation de ses mémoires sur le Général Antranik (in French)
Totovents at Amazon.com

References

1893 births
1938 deaths
Russian military personnel of World War I
Armenian activists
20th-century Armenian poets
University of Wisconsin–Madison alumni
Emigrants from the Ottoman Empire to the Russian Empire
Armenian journalists
Great Purge victims from Armenia
Soviet rehabilitations
Armenians from the Ottoman Empire
People from Elazığ
Armenian male poets
20th-century journalists